Zeidan (Arabic: زيدان‎) may refer to
Zeidan (name)
Tell Zeidan, an archaeological site in northern Syria
Salwa Zeidan Gallery, a contemporary art gallery in United Arab Emirates

See also
Zaydan